Que Ironía may refer to:

"Que Ironía", 1999 song by Rodrigo, also covered by Andy Andy
"Que Ironía", 2006 song by Mary Ann Acevedo from the album Mary Ann

See also  
 Ironia (disambiguation)